Halton Railway was a spur line from Wendover to RAF Halton used to transport coal and other goods to RAF Halton. It closed in 1963.

It also forwarded coal to the boilers on camp. The conversion of boilers on the station from coal fired to oil fired, allowed road-tankers to take over the inward flow of fuel and accelerated the demise of the railway and the last train ran on 29 March 1963 with closure following two days afterwards.

The majority of the track has since been removed, including the original bridge over the Grand Union Canal which was replaced by a modern footbridge, however much of the line is designated a permissive footpath (rail trail).

References

Closed railway lines in South East England